Wei Yimin (born 10 July 1971) is a retired Chinese football player.

Club career
Wei Yimin began his career in Dalian Wanda FC in 1994, and scored Dalian Wanda FC's first goal in professional football history. He won several Chinese Jia-A League titles, but was moved to substitution after the team signed Hao Haidong. He transferred several times, before retiring in 2003.

After retirement
Wei Yimin moved into aquaculture business after his retirement, cultivating sea cucumber in Changxing Island with a few former teammates, including Han Wenhai.

In 2016, Wei Yimin took part in the Jia-A League Star Tournament, representing Dalian Football Team.

On 8 February 2017, Dalian Transcendence announced that Wei Yimin will join the club as their chairman in 2017.

Honours
Dalian Wanda FC
Chinese Jia-A League: 1994, 1996, 1997, 1998
 Chinese Super Cup: 1997

References

External links
Player Profile at sodasoccer.com

1971 births
Living people
Chinese footballers
Footballers from Dalian
Chinese expatriate footballers
Dalian Shide F.C. players
Bayi Football Team players
Association football forwards